Jervois Arthur Newnham was an Anglican bishop in Canada from 1893 to 1921.

Born into an ecclesiastical family in 1852, he was educated at McGill University and began his ordained ministry as a curate at Christ Church Cathedral, Montreal after which he was the incumbent of Onslow. Later he was the rector of  St Matthias' Montreal. He became the Bishop of Moosonee in 1891 and was translated to Saskatchewan in 1904. He returned to England in 1921, becoming the rector of Clifton, Bedfordshire

Newnham died on 12 January 1941.

References

1852 births
McGill University alumni
19th-century Anglican Church of Canada bishops
Anglican bishops of Moosonee
Anglican bishops of Saskatchewan
20th-century Anglican Church of Canada bishops
1941 deaths
People from the Borough of Bedford